Allison Glacier is an ice stream on the west side of Heard Island in the southern Indian Ocean. Allison Glacier flows from Big Ben massif down to the sea to the south of Cape Gazert. 
To the north of Allison Glacier is Vahsel Glacier, whose terminus is at South West Bay, between Erratic Point and Cape Gazert. Immediately to the north of Vahsel Glacier is Schmidt Glacier, whose terminus is located between Mount Drygalski and North West Cornice. To the south of Allison Glacier is Abbotsmith Glacier, while Cape Gazert is immediately west.

Discovery and naming
Allison Glacier was named after Ian Allison, an Australian glaciologist who carried out glaciological research in this area in 1971 for the Australian Antarctic Division during the French-Australian Antarctic Expedition.

See also
List of glaciers in the Antarctic
Retreat of glaciers since 1850

References

Further reading

External links
Click here to see a map of Heard Island and McDonald Islands, including all major topographical features
Australian Antarctic Division
Australian Antarctic Gazetteer
Composite Gazetteer of Antarctica
Australian Antarctic Names and Medals Committee (AANMC)
Scientific Committee on Antarctic Research (SCAR)

Glaciers of Heard Island and McDonald Islands